Isis is a genus of deep-sea bamboo coral in the family Isididae.

See also 
 Isis hippuris

References

Isididae
Octocorallia genera